Sausso Rural LLG is a local-level government (LLG) of East Sepik Province, Papua New Guinea.

Wards
01. Urigembi
02. Japaraka
03. Yari/Nungawa
04. Wiomungu
05. Tuonumbu
06. Munji
07. Suadogum
08. Rofundogum
09. Bima
10. Timunangua
11. Werman
12. Bararat
13. Peringa
14. Wambe
15. Rabiawa (sic Rofuyawa)
16. Kambaraka
17. Wamagu
18. Japaraka 1
19. Porombe
20. Segero
21. Kusaun
22. Mindogum

References

Local-level governments of East Sepik Province